Thomas Bertels (born 5 November 1986) is a German former professional footballer who played either as a left-back or as a left midfielder.

Career
In January 2019, Bertels retired as a professional player.

References

External links

1986 births
Living people
Association football midfielders
German footballers
SV Lippstadt 08 players
SC Verl players
SC Paderborn 07 players
Bundesliga players
2. Bundesliga players
3. Liga players